Krasnoye Sormovo Shipyard No. 112 named after Andrei Zhdanov is one of the oldest shipbuilding factories in Russia, located in the 
Sormovsky City District of Nizhny Novgorod (formerly called Gorky).

Early history
The shipyard was established in 1849 by companies Nizhny Novgorod Machine Factory (Нижегородская машинная фабрика) and Volga Steam Navigation (Волжское пароходство). It was originally called the Nizhny Novgorod Machine Factory. In 1851, the factory began the construction of solid metal steamers. Three years later, it developed the production of screw schooners. In 1858, the Nizhny Novgorod Machine Factory produced the first Russian steam dredger. In 1870, the first Russian open hearth furnace was built at the yard, followed by a two-decked steamship Perevorot just a year later. In 1913, it produced a dry bulk cargo ship Danilikha. The factory built 489 ships between 1849 and 1918. It also produced steam engines, carriages, steam locomotives, tramcars, bridges, diesel engines, cannons, pontoons, and projectiles.

Steam locomotive builder 

Since 1898, one of the chief products of Sormovo Works was steam locomotives, although the plant continued building river paddle steamers for Volga service and, on a lesser scale, other industrial products. Lists of the factory's products from that period are preserved in magazines also found in collections both in Russia and elsewhere. Sormovo Work advertised in many industrial magazines, the last ads having been printed as late as 1916. The factory had close connections with Krauss Lokomotive Works in Munich, Germany until the outbreak of the First World War in 1914. Krauss sold its first  gauge steam locomotive to Eisenwerke Sormovo in 1884. Named W.Schlüter Krauss factory type 60 an 0-4-0T (Bt-n2) under its works number 1178 / 1884. The second locomotive followed in 1885, a  gauge 0-4-0T (Bt-n2) to Sormovo's internal industrial railway with Krauss works number 1668 / 1885. Sormovo Works built even its own public service railway branch connecting the factory to the Nizhnij Novgorod Station of the Moscow - Nizhnij Novgorod Railway.

During 1898–1917, Sormovo Works built 2164 steam locomotives. During 1918–1935, another 1111 standard Russian  gauge steam locomotives were built there. Then followed the two-year period when Sormovo built 200  gauge 0-8-0 (D-h2) Kolomna Locomotive Works factory type 157 steam locomotives, after which the factory switched to making submarine diesel motors. After the German-Soviet War of 1941-45, the steam locomotive production resumed; this time on the production line was the fourth and last version of standard Soviet passenger type Su 2-6-2 (1C1-h2) steam locomotives. Overall, 411 steam locomotives were built in 1947–1951.

The total steam locomotive production during 1898–1951 was 3886 steam locomotives. (Rakov 1995)

Military production

During the Russian Civil War of 1918-1920, the Nizhny Novgorod Machine Factory built armored trains, armored carriages, and weapons for the vessels of the Volga Military Flotilla. In 1920, the factory remanufactured fourteen burnt-out French Renault FT tanks for the Red Army, the Russkiy Renos, and assembled a single new copy, named 'Freedom Fighter Lenin'. In 1922, the factory changed its name by appending the adjective Krasnoye (Red) to it. During the German-Soviet War of 1941-1945, the Krasnoye Sormovo Factory produced T-34 medium tanks.  The turret for the upgunned T-34-85 was designed here by V. Kerichev in 1943.

After the war: shipbuilding

After the war, the factory switched to the sectional and large-block construction of ships, sea and river tankers, suction dredgers, and dredgers. The Krasnoye Sormovo Factory was one of the most progressive and innovative factories in the USSR. They built the first Soviet industrial device for the continuous pouring of steel. They developed an automated process of pouring and cutting slabs with the use of radioisotope technology, produced the first Soviet hydrofoils (Raketa), designed. They also built passenger diesel-electric ships Lenin and Soviet Union for the Volga River Navigation company, the first high-speed passenger hovercraft Sormovich, a few diesel-electric railroad ferries for the Baku-Krasnovodsk route, and a unique 250-tonne double-hulled floating crane Kyor-Ogly. Currently, this company is in  charge of a cruise ship named after Mustai Karim, a Bashkir Soviet poet, writer and playwright. This will the be first Russian Cruise ship in 60 years and has following specification:
 overall Length: 141 m,
 Beam overall: 16.80 m,
 Draft: 3 m,
 Midships depth: 5 m,
 Operating speed: 22.5 km/h,
 Passenger capacity: 342 people,
 Crew and maintenance personnel: 144 people.

Awards 
The Krasnoye Sormovo Factory was awarded two Orders of Lenin (1943, 1949), Order of the October Revolution (1970), Order of the Patriotic War (1 Class, 1945), and Order of the Red Banner of Labour (1939). The factory exists to this day and is now a part of the United Shipbuilding Corporation.

See also 
 List of Russian steam locomotive classes
 Soviet tank factories

References

Bibliography
Zaloga, Steven J., James Grandsen (1984). Soviet Tanks and Combat Vehicles of World War Two. London: Arms and Armour Press. .
 Vitali A. Rakov (Виталий Александрович Раков) (1995). "Lokomotivy otjetsjestvjennyh zheleznyh dorog 1845–1955". (Locomotives of our country's railways). Moscow: Transport. .

External links

Official website of the Krasnoye Sormovo Factory 
List of existing steam locomotives built by Sormovo

Manufacturing companies of the Soviet Union
United Shipbuilding Corporation
Companies nationalised by the Soviet Union
Transport in the Soviet Union
1849 establishments in the Russian Empire
Manufacturing companies based in Nizhniy Novgorod
Buildings and structures in Nizhny Novgorod
Shipbuilding companies of the Soviet Union
Defence companies of the Soviet Union
Historic centre of Nizhny Novgorod